The Tommy Bahama Challenge was a golf event on the PGA Tour's "Challenge Season," a slate of Tour events that do not count towards the PGA's official money season. It was held at the Grayhawk Golf Club in Scottsdale, Arizona, and lasted for only two years.

Sponsored by the clothing company Tommy Bahama, the event began in 2004, and pitted a team of four golfers from the United States versus an international team of four golfers, each with a non-playing captain. The tournament featured a unique rule — only players 30 or under could be invited. In 2004, scoring was also done unusually — each player was pitted against another for one-on-one matches; their scores were kept under stroke play rules, while the event's overall total was kept under match play rules. One player's win in a match earned his team a point. For the 2005 event, the format was changed — all the matches and the event were scored using match play rules.

In the event of a tie (which happened in 2004), the rules specified that a sudden-death playoff would take place using the alternate shot rule (for example, on a par 4, one players hits the tee shot, another hits it onto the green from its spot on the fairway, yet another attempts a putt and misses, and the last member makes the second putt to finish the hole).

The 2004 event, which took place in early November 2004, was broadcast on television in the United States by CBS on New Year's Day. The November 2005 event was aired on January 2, 2006.

Winners

References 

Team golf tournaments
PGA Tour unofficial money events
Golf in Arizona
Sports competitions in Scottsdale, Arizona